Xocotl is the generic Nahuatl language classification for sour or acidic fruit, used in the names of many species of fruit tree including atoya-xocotl (flowing stream plum), maza-xocotl (deer plum), atoya-xocotl (large plum ciruela) te-xocotl (yellow or red hawberries),  xal-xocotl (sand plum or guava), and coua-xocotl (serpent fruit), but also used in particular for jocote (Spondias purpurea).

References 

Edible fruits
Mesoamerican cuisine

es:Xócotl